Le Soler is a commune in the Pyrénées-Orientales department in southern France.

Geography 
Le Soler is located in the canton of La Vallée de la Têt and in the arrondissement of Perpignan.

Population

See also
Communes of the Pyrénées-Orientales department

References

Communes of Pyrénées-Orientales